Dar Laadhar (Arabic: دار العذار) is one of the oldest and most prestigious houses of the Medina of Sfax, Tunisia.

Dar Laadhar is located in the north-western quarter of the medina, in Cheikh Tijani street (also known as zuqaq El Dhhab or The Gold's Street), one of the most prestigious streets of the medina in the 19th century. The house is close to Dar Kammoun.

History 
The house belongs to the Laadhar family, a wealthy family of Sfax in the 19th century. The house was restored in 2012.

Residents 
Notable residents include:
 Mohamed Laadhar – judge of Sfax by Sadok Bey in the 19th century.
 Mohamed ben Hadj Mohamed ben Said Laadhar – The imam of Bouchouicha mosque, he became a judge by an order from Ali Bey on 5 August 1900. He was appointed by An-Nasir Bey as a Bach Mufti on 10 March 1919.

See also 
 Dar Laadhar , on BebJebli.tn

References 

Medina of Sfax